Vincent Stone is an Australian singer. He was signed after impressing Sony Music while playing showcase gigs at Les Girls. His single "Sunshine" saw him nominated for 1994 ARIA Awards for Best New Talent and Breakthrough Artist – Single.

Stone moved into acting and had roles in Superman Returns and Love My Way before playing a lead role in the Australian thriller The Backpacker.

Stone is also known for being the model for the character of Strelok in the videogame S.T.A.L.K.E.R.: Shadow of Chernobyl.

Discography

Studio albums

Singles

Awards and nominations

ARIA Music Awards
The ARIA Music Awards is an annual awards ceremony that recognises excellence, innovation, and achievement across all genres of Australian music. They commenced in 1987.

|
|-
| rowspan="2"| 1994
| rowspan="2"| "Sunshine"
| ARIA Award for Best New Talent
| 
| rowspan="2"|
|-
| ARIA Award for Breakthrough Artist - Single
| 
|-

Filmography

References

Australian male singers
Living people
Year of birth missing (living people)